Hartwick is a census-designated place (CDP) forming the central settlement of the town of Hartwick in Otsego County, New York, United States. It is located at the corner of CR-11 and NY-205. The population of the CDP was 629 at the 2010 census.

Geography
Hartwick is located at  (42.65972, -75.04881).

The Otego Creek flows southward through the hamlet.

Demographics

References

Census-designated places in New York (state)
Census-designated places in Otsego County, New York